Leroy Johnson may refer to:
J. Leroy Johnson (1888–1961), United States congressman from California
Leroy S. Johnson (1888–1986), leader of the Fundamentalist Church of Jesus Christ of Latter Day Saints
Leroy Johnson (Medal of Honor) (1919–1944), American World War II soldier
Leroy Johnson (Georgia politician) (1928-2019), American lawyer and politician
LeRoy Johnson Jr. (1935–2011), editor and research archeologist at the Texas Historical Commission
LeRoy Johnson (artist) (born in 1937), American artist
LeRoy Johnson (politician) (born 1941), Canadian teacher, politician and former MLA for Wetaskiwin-Camrose, Alberta
Leroy Johnson, fictional character in the Fame movie and television series